Juncos Hollinger Racing, formerly Juncos Racing, is an Argentine-American racing team competing in the NTT IndyCar Series, Indy Lights and Indy Pro 2000 Championship series in the Road to Indy ladder for IndyCar. Owned by Ricardo Juncos, who formed the team in 1997, the team was initially based in Argentina before limited racing opportunities in that country led to the team moving to the United States. The team is currently based in Indianapolis, Indiana. Following Williams F1 shareholder Brad Hollinger's entry to the team as partner in 2021, the team was renamed to Juncos Hollinger Racing.

Ricardo Juncos
Ricardo Juncos is a second-generation and former Formula Renault driver who grew up with a deep passion and desire for racing. At the age of 14, Juncos made his first steps in the racing community driving karts in Argentina. Through his success in karts, Juncos was able to join the Formula Renault class, competing throughout South America. After funding became difficult, Juncos began working for many race teams to continue his racing career. During this time, Juncos was able to learn all aspects of the car in and out, along with schooling in mechanical and electrical engineering.

Racing history

Argentina to the United States
Stationed in Buenos Aires, Argentina and headed by Ricardo Juncos, Juncos Racing became a full-service formula racing team in 1997. The team competed from 1997 through 2003 in the Formula Renault 1600 Championship, Formula Renault 2000 Championship, and the National Sport Prototype Championship of Argentina In 2003, the team relocated to Miami, Florida as a full-service karting team.  During the first few years in the U.S., the team picked up 19 local, regional, and national karting titles. Juncos Racing moved operations north to Indiana, where they developed into a formula open-wheel racing team in 2008. After being formed in 1997 by Ricardo Juncos in Argentina, the team competed from 1997 through 2003 in the Formula Renault 1600 Championship, Formula Renault 2000 Championship, and the National Sport Prototype Championship of Argentina.

Indy Pro 2000 Championship

Star Mazda era (2009–2012) 
In 2009, the team entered the Star Mazda series. The team was surprisingly strong in its first season, finishing second in the driver’s championship and third in the team championship with driver Peter Dempsey. In 2010 Juncos driver Conor Daly won the Star Mazda Championship, winning seven of the thirteen races. Juncos' other driver Tatiana Calderón finished tenth. In 2011 Daly left the team to advance to the Indy Lights series, and the team replaced him with driver João Victor Horto. Horto would finish the season fourth and Calderón sixth. Calderón finished third in the race at Barber Motorsports Park, becoming the first woman to achieve a podium finish in the series.

In 2012 Calderón left to race in the Formula Three series in Europe. Horto and Juncos moved up to the Indy Lights series on a limited basis, while the team signed Connor De Phillippi, Bruno Palli, Martin Scuncio, and Diego Ferreira for their Star Mazda cars. De Phillippi would win two races and finish fourth, while Scuncio would win one race and finish eighth after missing the season finale. Ferreira would finish sixth and Palli twelfth. Ferreira was named "Most Improved Driver of the Year.

Pro Mazda Championship era (2013–2018) 
In 2013, the team would enter Ferreira and Scott Anderson in the series, now renamed the Pro Mazda Championship. Ferreira would finish second behind a dominant Matthew Brabham. Anderson finished fifth.

For 2014 the team entered four cars full-time in the series, driven by Spencer Pigot, Kyle Kaiser, Julia Ballario, and Jose Gutierrez. Juncos Racing started the year off on a high note, winning the Cooper Tires Winterfest Championship in both the team and driver (Spencer Pigot) championship. Pigot went on to win six of the fourteen races en route to a championship. Kyle Kaiser and Jose Gutierrez both took wins in the season finale at Sonoma. For 2015, Gutierrez returned to the team along with new drivers Will Owen, Timothé Buret and Garett Grist, who moved over from Andretti Autosport.

Indy Pro 2000 Championship era (2019–2022) 
In 2019, the championship was rebranded into "Indy Pro 2000", following the departure of Mazda. The team would win the teams' championship that year, with Swedish driver Rasmus Lindh narrowly missing the top spot in the drivers' championship, finishing only 2 points behind champion Kyle Kirkwood.

The team's 2020 season saw American driver Sting Ray Robb clinch the drivers' title with two races remaining in the season.

Indy NXT
The team made its first attempt to field a car in the Indy Lights series (the next series above Pro-Mazda) in 2012, with one car which was limited to six of the twelve races with three different drivers taking the wheel.

In November 2014, the team announced it would be fielding two cars full-time in the series for 2015 and would be elevating drivers Spencer Pigot and Kyle Kaiser from Pro Mazda to be the drivers. Pigot began the 2015 season with five straight podium appearances, including winning both races of the doubleheader at Barber Motorsports Park. With six wins and nine podiums in 16 races, he was crowned champion over Jack Harvey and Ed Jones.

The organization secured their second championship with Kyle Kaiser in 2017 after he obtained three wins and eight podiums, which earned Kaiser a $1 million scholarship to participate in the 2018 IndyCar Series.

IndyCar Series

First stint in the series (2017–2019) 
In May 2015, Ricardo Juncos announced the team would be building a new facility in Speedway, Indiana (home of the Indianapolis Motor Speedway), with the intention of future participation in the IndyCar Series. The facility, called the Juncos Technical Center, would cost three million dollars and be 41,000 square feet in size. On May 9, 2017 it was announced that Spencer Pigot would rejoin Juncos for its IndyCar debut at the 2017 Indianapolis 500. The following day, the team announced veteran Sebastián Saavedra would drive a second entry for the team.

At the 2019 Indianapolis 500 Kyle Kaiser managed to qualify the team's lone entry onto the last spot for the starting lineup. While the team successfully qualifying for the Indianapolis 500 was not insignificant in itself, Kaiser and Juncos' effort is best remembered for knocking two time Formula One world champion Fernando Alonso out of the starting line up for the Indianapolis 500, ending Alonso's joint McLaren/Carlin effort and creating one of the more notable underdog stories in the long history of racing at Indianapolis Motor Speedway.

Return to IndyCar Series (2021–present) 
The team did not participate in the 2020 season, citing difficulties due to the COVID-19 pandemic as a reason. For the 2021 Indianapolis 500 Juncos leased their chassis to Paretta Autosport on behalf of Team Penske, with Simona De Silvestro driving the car. De Silvestro managed to qualify the Juncos car in the last available spot for the Indianapolis 500 but ultimately retired from the race.

Following investment by new team co-owner Brad Hollinger, Juncos was renamed to Juncos Hollinger Racing and returned to the series with a single entry for the last three races of the 2021 season, starting from the Grand Prix of Portland. On September 10, 2021, 2020 Formula 2 Championship runner-up and Scuderia Ferrari Formula One test driver Callum Ilott was announced as their driver for the remaining three rounds of the 2021 season, after initially being confirmed only for one race. He would finish 25th on his IndyCar debut, completing only 77 out of 110 laps due to a mechanical issue mid-race.

Juncos Hollinger Racing returned full-time in 2022, after the purchase of assets previously owned by Carlin. Ilott continued to race the No. 77 entry in all races except for the Detroit Grand Prix, as he was recovering from injuries sustained in the previous week's Indianapolis 500, with Santino Ferrucci standing in for the Detroit round. Ilott would return to the No. 77 from the Road America race until the end of the season, finishing 20th in the championship.

In September 2022, the team confirmed an expansion to a two-car entry for the 2023 season. In January 2023, four-time Turismo Carretera champion Agustín Canapino was announced as JHR's second full-time driver in the No. 78 car.

Drivers

IndyCar Series (2017–2019; 2021–present)
 Spencer Pigot (2017)
 Sebastián Saavedra (2017)
 René Binder (2018)
 Alfonso Celis Jr. (2018)
 Kyle Kaiser (2018–2019)
 Callum Ilott (2021–present)
 Agustin Canapino (2023–present)

Indy NXT (2012, 2015–2019, 2021, 2023–present)
 João Victor Horto (2012)
 Chase Austin (2012)
 Bruno Palli (2012)
 Kyle Kaiser (2015–2017) Series Champion
 Spencer Pigot (2015) Series Champion
 Zachary Claman DeMelo (2016)
 Nicolas Dapero (2017)
 Alfonso Celis Jr. (2018)
 Heamin Choi (2018)
 Victor Franzoni (2018)
 Rinus VeeKay (2019)
 Dalton Kellett (2019)
 Sting Ray Robb (2021)
 Toby Sowery (2021)
 Rasmus Lindh (2021)
 Matteo Nannini (2023–present)
 Reece Gold (2023–present)

Indy Pro 2000 Championship (2009–2022)
 Michael Furfari (2009)
 Walt Bowlin (2009)
 Sean Burstyn (2009-2010)
 Peter Dempsey (2009)
 Toshi Deki (2009)
 Conor Daly (2010) Series Champion
 Rusty Mitchell (2010)
 Hayden Duerson (2010)
 Tatiana Calderón (2010–2011)
 Martin Scuncio (2010–2012)
 João Victor Horto (2011)
 Gustavo Menezes (2011)
 Bruno Palli (2012)
 Diego Ferreira (2012–2013)
 Scott Anderson (2013)
 Julia Ballario (2013–2014)
 Jose Gutierrez (2013–2015)
 Spencer Pigot (2014) Series Champion
 Kyle Kaiser (2014)
 Timothe Buret (2015)
 Will Owen (2015–2016)
 Garett Grist (2015–2016)
 Nicolas Dapero (2016)
 Jake Parsons (2016)
 Victor Franzoni (2017) Series Champion
 Jeff Green (2017)
 Rinus VeeKay (2018) Series Champion
 Robert Megennis (2018)
 Rasmus Lindh (2019)
 Sting Ray Robb (2019–2020) Series Champion
 Artem Petrov (2020)
 Reece Gold (2021–2022)
 Manuel Sulaimán (2021)
 Kyffin Simpson (2021)
 Enaam Ahmed (2021–2022)

Complete series results

IndyCar Series
(key)

* Season still in progress

 In conjunction with AFS Racing.

Indy NXT
(key)

Star Mazda/Pro Mazda/Indy Pro 2000 Championship
(key)

 Masters Series.
 Expert Series.

References

External links
Official website

American auto racing teams
IndyCar Series teams
Indy Lights teams
WeatherTech SportsCar Championship teams
Argentine auto racing teams
Auto racing teams established in 1997